Nigaar Khan (born 2 May 1979) is an Indian television actress mainly known for her portrayal of negative characters.

Early life 

Khan was born and brought up in Pune, Maharashtra. She is the elder sister of model-actress Gauahar Khan.

Career
In 2008, Khan participated in the dancing competition show Ek Khiladi Ek Haseena. Their dance in one of the episodes on the song "Woh Ladki Hai Kaha" (Dil Chahta Hai) was well appreciated by the judges, Sushmita Sen and Wasim Akram, and the audience.

In 2011, the reality TV show The Khan Sisters focused on the lives of Khan and her sister Gauahar. The following year Khan appeared in the show Sacch Ka Saamna. She also hosted the show Love Story,  showcased some love stories of Bollywood. Khan presented the stories and interviewed various celebrities.

In 2013, Khan appeared on the reality show Welcome – Baazi Mehmaan-Nawaazi Ki along with VJ Andy, Ragini Khanna and Sanaya Irani. Since September 2013, Khan has appeared in the mythological show Buddha based on life of Gautama Buddha. She plays the role of Buddha's aunt and Devadatta's mother.

In November 2014, Nigaar participated in Bigg Boss 8 as wild card entrant. She survived for 2 weeks. 

In June 2016, she made a comeback on television in the children's show Baal Veer on SAB TV as an evil fairy called Prachandika to create hurdles in the life of Baal Veer.

Personal life
Nigaar Khan married her long-time boyfriend and Pakistani business man Khayyam Sheikh in Dubai on 23 July 2015. Nigaar has moved to Dubai post her marriage.

Television

References

External links

 

1979 births
Living people
Place of birth missing (living people)
Indian television actresses
Actresses in Hindi television
Bigg Boss (Hindi TV series) contestants